The Asian Television Award for Best Actress in a Leading Role is awarded annually by the Asian Television Awards.

Winners and nominees

Television awards for Best Actress